Michael Arthur Norman Jr. (born December 3, 1997) is an American sprinter. He holds the world best time in the indoor 400 meters at 44.52 seconds.  Outdoors, his 43.45, set at the 2019 Mt. SAC Relays is tied as the #4 on the all time list. In 2016, he became the world junior champion in both the 200 meters and 4×100 meter relay. In 2022, he became the world champion in both the 400 meters and 4x400 meter relay.

Norman first gained international attention as a high school senior after he defeated reigning USA champion Justin Gatlin in a semi-final heat of the 200 meters at the 2016 Olympic Trials. He eventually placed fifth in the final and did not qualify for the Olympic team. However, he secured two gold medals at the World Junior Championships later that summer, highlighted by a championship record of 20.17 in the 200 meters.

A four-time NCAA champion, Norman set or helped set collegiate records in every NCAA final he ran in 2018. This includes his world best time in the indoor 400 meters and an unofficial world record in the indoor 4×400 meter relay when he anchored the USC Trojans to a winning time of 3:00.77.

Throughout his career, Norman has won numerous awards including the Gatorade Player of the Year awards for track and field in both 2015 and 2016, and The Bowerman in 2018. Norman graduated from the University of Southern California in May 2019 and currently competes professionally for Nike under his college coaches Quincy Watts and Caryl Smith Gilbert. Michael Norman is one of only 3 men along with Wayde Van Niekerk and Fred Kerley to go sub 10 seconds in 100m, sub 20 seconds in 200m and sub 44 seconds in 400m.

Biography

Norman was born to an African-American father and a Japanese mother in San Diego, California.

High school
As a high school junior at Vista Murrieta in Murrieta, CA, Norman broke the NFHS record in the 400 meters with a time of 45.19 seconds at the 2015 CIF California State Meet held at Buchanan High School on June 6, 2015. His time is the fastest 400 meters run by a U.S. high school athlete against other high school-aged athletes, along with Aldrich Bailey who also ran 45.19 seconds in Lubbock, Texas on April 28, 2012.

On June 6, 2015, Norman had arguably one of the most impressive one-day performances by a high school athlete. The Vista Murrieta High School junior started his day at the 2015 CIF California State Meet by completely separating from the field on the first leg of the 4×100 meter relay, a performance that PrepCalTrack editor Rich Gonzalez described as "jaw-dropping."  In his second event of the day, Norman ran 45.19 seconds in the 400 meters, a time that ranked #6 all-time for U.S. high school athletes and tied the NFHS record. Norman came back to win his second individual state title in the 200 meters with a time of 20.30 seconds, a time that also ranked #6 all-time for U.S. high school athletes. Just one hour later, Norman was back on the track with his team for the 4×400 meter relay and produced yet another memorable performance by splitting roughly 44.9 seconds on the anchor leg to bring Vista Murrieta from 7th place to 3rd place in the event. With a total contribution of 21.5 points out of the 37 points scored, Norman led his school to its first-ever state title in any sport. Also worth noting is that, including the preliminary rounds from the previous day, Norman ran 7 races within 28 hours at the CIF California State Meet and still produced some of the top marks in the history of high school athletics.

On June 13, 2015, Norman competed in the Adidas Dream 100 meters at the Adidas Grand Prix at Icahn Stadium. With this being his first competitive race in the 100 meters, Norman shocked some of the most talented U.S. high school 100 meter runners by winning the race in 10.36 seconds (-0.5 m/s). On June 27, 2015, Norman set a California state record in the 200 meters at the 2015 USA Junior Outdoor Track and Field Championships at Hayward Field by running 20.24 seconds, and in doing so equaled the #5 all-time mark for U.S. high school athletes in the event. This race also ranked Norman #8 all-time on the U.S. junior (under-20) list and #10 all-time on the world junior list. Norman's placement in this race qualified him to compete at the 2015 Pan American Junior Athletics Championships, but he decided to forgo his spot on the United States team to avoid extending his competitive season by another month. Norman's times from the 2015 season in both the 200 meters and 400 meters made him eligible to compete at the 2016 United States Olympic Trials.

On June 30, 2015, Norman was named the Gatorade Player of the Year for his achievements in track and field. He is only the 28th non-senior to win the Gatorade Player of the Year award in the 30-year history of the program across all sports and the first male sprinter to win the honor as a non-senior.

College
On March 10, 2018, Norman competed at the NCAA Division I Indoor Track and Field Championships and ran an American and collegiate record in the 400 meters with a world best time of 44.52 seconds. Later that day he, along with the rest of the USC Trojans 4×400 meter relay team, broke the American and collegiate record in a world best time of 3:00.77. Both of the 400 meters and 4×400 meter relay performances were faster than the official world records, but they were not ratified due to various technical reasons, including teammate Rai Benjamin having not been cleared by the IAAF to represent the United States yet. On June 8, 2018, Norman ran a 2018 world leading time in the 400 meters with a time of 43.61 seconds at the NCAA Division I Outdoor Track and Field Championships. This time ranked him as the 6th fastest 400 meter runner in history.

To cap off his collegiate career, Norman was named winner of The Bowerman for the 2018 track and field season. He was the first USC Trojan to win the award. His teammate and best friend, Rai Benjamin was also one of the three finalists.

Professional career
Michael Norman made his pro debut on June 30, 2018 at the 2018 IAAF Diamond League in Paris, winning the (non-scoring) 200 m in a personal best time of 19.84 s, ahead of his USC teammate Rai Benjamin who finished second in 19.99 s.

On July 20, 2020 while competing in the 100m sprint at the AP Ranch High Performance Invite #2 Track Meet he ran a 9.86s his first sub-10 100m sprint.  With this performance, Michael Norman became the second athlete, after 400m World Record holder Wayde van Niekerk, to join the "Sub 10s, 20s, 44s club for the 100m, 200m & 400m sprints". Fred Kerley joined the club in 2021.

Statistics
Information from World Athletics profile unless otherwise noted.

Personal bests

Seasonal bests

National competition record

NCAA results from Track & Field Results Reporting System.

International competition record

Circuit Wins
Outdoor
Diamond League
Final winner: 2019 (400 m, Brussels)
Paris: 2018 (200 m)
Rome: 2019 (200 m)
Stockholm: 2019 (400 m)
Eugene: 2019 (400 m)
Brussels: 2019 (400 m)
Doha: 2021 (400 m)
Eugene: 2022 (400 m)
Indoor
World Indoor Tour Gold
Boston: 2021 (400 m)

See also
 2020 in 100 metres

Notes

References

External links

 (Track & Field Results Reporting System)
Michael Norman bio at USC Athletics

Videos
Michael Norman and Rai Benjamin at the Mt SAC Relays 2019 via MyStyle Records on YouTube
Michael Norman's record NCAA Indoor 400m | 2018 via the NCAA on YouTube
Michael Norman Upsets Noah Lyles at Diamond League | NBC Sports via NBC Sports on YouTube

1997 births
Living people
American male sprinters
American sportspeople of Japanese descent
People from Murrieta, California
Sportspeople from Riverside County, California
Track and field athletes from California
USC Trojans men's track and field athletes
United States collegiate record holders in athletics (track and field)
World Athletics Championships athletes for the United States
World Athletics Championships winners
Diamond League winners
USA Outdoor Track and Field Championships winners
Athletes (track and field) at the 2020 Summer Olympics
Medalists at the 2020 Summer Olympics
Olympic gold medalists for the United States in track and field